Gex is a platform video game video game series, developed by Crystal Dynamics, that details the adventures of an anthropomorphic gecko named Gex. He has served as the mascot of Crystal Dynamics, appearing on their company logo for several years until 2000. In the North American version, Gex is voiced by comedian Dana Gould; the United Kingdom version features Gould, Leslie Phillips and Danny John-Jules as Gex's voice. Gex was voiced by Mitsuo Senda for the Japanese release of the second game.

The games are largely inspired by American TV culture. Gex contributes to the games with wise-cracking remarks laced with media and references to popular culture.

The Gex series has sold a total of over 15 million copies for all platforms.

Sony Interactive Entertainment published Gex 3: Deep Cover Gecko on October 1, 2009, Gex on November 5, 2009, and Gex: Enter the Gecko on February 4, 2014 under the PS one Classics banner in the PlayStation Network. The ports are compatible with the PlayStation 3, Portable and Vita. Additionally, Square Enix published Gex at GOG.com, a distribution platform for legacy games, on October 16, 2014.

Plot
Gex is a gecko who has a passion for television which makes him a target for the cybernetic being Emperor Rez. Emperor Rez is determined to overthrow The Media Dimension, the "world" of television.

Games

Gex (1995)

Gex: Enter the Gecko (1998)

Gex 3: Deep Cover Gecko (1999)

Cancelled Projects
A fourth Gex entry was in development for the PlayStation 2 and GameCube, but was canceled due to lack of interest from Eidos Interactive. Many of the ideas and aspects were later used for Whiplash for the PS2 with only concept art existing of the Gex 4 idea.

An unreleased prototype for a cancelled 2001 game referred to as Gex Jr. was leaked online for the PS1 in April 2022.

Characters
 Gex - Gex is a smart aleck, wise-cracking gecko who lives with his family in Maui, Hawaii. He spends his days with his friends, surfing, playing the ukulele and throwing poi parties down on the beach with the local lady lizards. After his father's death, he begins watching mass amounts of TV to get over the tragedy. He eventually inherits over twenty billion dollars from his deceased great uncle, and buys the world's largest television. He has his own island hideaway called the GEXCave located in the South Pacific. His catchphrase is "It's tail time!", due to his primary attack being tail whips. Gex is voiced by Dana Gould in all three installments in North America. The PAL (European and Australian game formats) versions feature three separate voice actors; Dana Gould in the original game, Leslie Phillips in the second game, and Danny John-Jules in the third game.
 Rez - Rez is a megalomaniac, cybernetic entity, and the main antagonist of the series. His one true ambition is to control the entire Media Dimension under his own control and ensure the longevity of bad TV shows and Z-Grade movies. His entire essence is made up of Liquid Rez, liquid noise spread throughout the series. He also claims to be Gex's father as a homage to Star Wars. Rez is voiced by Bruce Robertson.
 Agent Xtra - Agent Xtra is Gex's crime-fighting partner, who also loves TV as well. She is kidnapped by Rez, and communicates to Gex through video signals in mission control. She is portrayed in live-action sequences by Marliece Andrada.
 Alfred - Alfred is Gex's butler. He is a turtle who wears a bow tie and glasses. He provides Gex with constant help to defeat Rez. He is voiced by Marc Silk.
 Rex - Rex is a small, red Tyrannosaurus rex and Gex's prehistoric ancestor. He is frozen in a block of ice at the "Holiday Broadcasting" channel that Gex melts to set him free.
 Cuz - Cuz is Gex's overweight cousin and seems to be a leopard gecko. He is saved by Gex after being locked in a cage by the gangsters at the "Gangsters TV" channel.
 Gex's Dad - Gex's Dad works for NASA by doing various research projects. He and ten other volunteers are chosen to eat tapioca pudding in zero gravity, though their rocket explodes due to a Band-Aid floating into one of the fuel tanks, killing them. His mother later moves to California, and after gaining money inherited from Gex's great-uncle, Charlie, she purchases 51 percent ownership in NASA, fires everyone, sells the rockets to some third world countries, and converts Mission Control into "Space Monkeys", a theme restaurant featuring robotic dancing chimps wearing spacesuits. In the novel, Rez claims that he is Gex's real father and became the way he was after the explosion, whether this is true or not is unclear, although Rez makes the same claim in Gex 2 but with a different story (saying he fell into a scrapheap while trying to get free cable).

Future
In February 2015, Square Enix announced to allow developers to create games based on some of their old Eidos intellectual properties via the Square Enix Collective project, including the Gex intellectual property. In December 2021, Square Enix filed a new Gex trademark in the European Union, and subsequently in February a new trademark for Gex in Japan. However three months later, Embracer Group made an agreement to purchase Crystal Dynamics and Eidos IPs from Square Enix, which includes Gex.

Legacy
Gex appears as an unlockable character in the North American and European versions of Hot Shots Golf 2 and Mad Dash Racing.

In June 2022, a fan animation of the game was uploaded to YouTube by FlippinDingDong. It was presented as a tape recording of a 1990s animated series that aired on Toon Disney. The clip features Gex's characteristic one-liners. The animation would later become viral on YouTube.

References

External links
 

 
Video game franchises
Video game franchises introduced in 1995
Internet memes